Roman Ochanovich Khagba (born 23 July 1964) is a former Georgian-Russian professional footballer.

Club career
He made his professional debut in the Soviet Second League in 1983 for FC Dinamo Sukhumi.

Honours
 Soviet Cup winner: 1988.

References

1964 births
People from Gudauta
Footballers from Abkhazia
Living people
Soviet footballers
Russian footballers
Association football midfielders
FC Dinamo Sukhumi players
FC Torpedo Kutaisi players
FC Guria Lanchkhuti players
FC Dinamo Tbilisi players
FC Metalist Kharkiv players
FC Zhemchuzhina Sochi players
Melaka United F.C. players
Russian Premier League players
Russian expatriate footballers
Expatriate footballers in Malaysia